Kellogg Doolittle Residence (also known as, High Desert House) is a residential dwelling in Joshua Tree, California. It was designed by Kendrick Bangs Kellogg for Beverly and Jay Doolittle, in 1988.  Its construction was completed in 2014.

The Residence is considered to be one of the most sublime and dramatic examples of organic architecture in the United States. It is located in a large set of granite boulders and faces south into the adjacent Joshua Tree National Park. The interior structure is technically wall-less and is formed by 26 cantilevered concrete columns, which allowed the architect Kellogg to incorporate the existing boulders themselves into the home. The Architect said he “wanted the home to look like it was crouching on the rocks".

History 
Kellogg Doolittle Residence is located on the land that was originally purchased by Carl Doolittle in 1978. In 1985, Beverly and Jay Doolittle agreed to buy the 10.5-acre plot of land from Carl Doolittle. The couple first became aware of architect Kellogg through his work, published in April 1984, in the Friends of Keybar Newsletter when he got his California architectural license.

The Doolittles wanted to build something “incredibly artful, organic, and ground-breaking.” Ken Kellogg offered to design their home on this “unconventional building site in the California Desert” via a letter, in 1986. Kellogg met Doolittles and surveyed the location from March to April (1986). In 1993, the outside structure of the house was completed. However, the interior design took another 21 years to finish. The home was completed in 2014.

Design 
The house consists of two buildings; the main house which is elevated on the rocks, and a smaller apartment at street level. These structures are separated by a long-paved  path of 500 feet, that starts from street level up to the elevation of the home. The house is estimated to be 6,000 square feet. Though, due to the house’s highly irregular shape and construction, no one has been able to accurately measure the square footage.

In 1991, Kellogg brought in John Vugrin to design and fabricate the complete interior, and the nine exterior doors, and handle the completion of the exterior.

Exterior 
The residence is formed of 26 cantilevered columns sunk seven feet into the bedrock. Kellogg also made use of existing boulders in situ to form parts of the exterior twenty six column. The space between all columns is filled with window panes and custom-fabricated doors. The columns overlap at the top, creating a layered canopy-like roof that blends inside, and connects all the spaces in the house without the existence of walls.

Interior 
The interior was designed and fabricated by Kellogg’s master craftsman John Vugrin. It is hand-hewn from natural materials using soared, twisted curvilinear forms. Discrete rooms are parsed by large, arched concrete pillars, allowing them to be more spacious.

References 

Architecture in California
Houses in California